Seelie is a term for fairies in Scottish folklore, appearing in the form of seely wights or The Seelie Court. The Northern and Middle English word  (also ,), and the Scots form , mean "happy", "lucky" or "blessed." Despite their name, the seelie folk of legend could be morally ambivalent and dangerous. Calling them "seelie," similar to names such as "good neighbors," may have been a euphemism to ward off their anger.

Etymology 
The Modern Standard English word "silly" is also derived from this root. 

The antonym, unseely (also unsall, unsell) means "unhappy", "misfortunate" or "unholy."

Seelie wights 
Many Scottish ballads and tales tell of "Seilie wichts" or "wights," meaning blessed beings. Julian Goodare theorized that these were legendary nature spirits, similar to but distinct from fairies. Goodare additionally hypothesized that there was a sixteenth-century shamanistic cult centering around these beings, comparable to the Italian Benandanti and donas de fuera. One of the earliest pieces of evidence comes from the sixteenth-century theologian William Hay, who complained of witches and local pagans claiming to meet with fairy-like women called "celly vichtys." The name is also similar to the Swiss-German "Sälïgen Lütt."

Seelie and Unseelie courts 
The Seelie Court is a group of fairies, often specified as good fairies who contrast with the wicked Unseelie Court. As described by British folklorist Katharine Mary Briggs, the Seelie Court were those fairies who would seek help from humans, warn those who have accidentally offended them, and return human kindness with favors of their own. Still, a fairy belonging to this court would avenge insults and could be prone to mischief. 

Conversely, the Unseelie Court were the darkly-inclined fairies who would attack without provocation. Briggs equated the Unseelie Court with the Sluagh (who abducted travelers at night and fired elf-shot) as well as the shellycoat, nuckelavee, redcaps, baobhan sith, and various other wicked fairies from English, Scottish and Irish lore.

The "seely court" is mentioned in the ballad of "Allison Gross," where they play a benevolent role. "Allison Gross" was recorded from Anne or Anna Gorden of Aberdeen, Scotland, sometime around 1783. The seely court is also named in at least one fragmentary version of "Tam Lin," where they are more negative figures.

Welsh folklore 
A possible equivalent to the Scottish "seelie" appears in the Welsh "sili," used in some individual fairy names. In a Welsh tale, "Sili go Dwt" was the name of a Rumpelstiltskin-like fairy whose name had to be guessed. In a possibly related fragmentary story, a fairy woman was heard singing the words "sili ffrit" while she spun thread. Sir John Rhys found that "sili ffrit" was sometimes used as a term for a child of the Tywlyth Teg or for anything small. 

Rhys proposed that "sili" came from the English "silly" (in this sense meaning happy) and "ffrit" from "fright," thus a term for a ghost. The term would have come to Wales via the Welsh marches. He also suggested that "Sili go Dwt" was a corruption of English fairy names featuring the syllable "tot" (such as Tom Tit Tot).

See also 

 Classifications of Fairies

References 
Fairies
Scottish folklore